Tifo is the phenomenon whereby tifosi of a sports team makes a visual display of any choreographed flag, sign or banner in the stands of a stadium, mostly as part of an association football match.

Tifos are most commonly seen in important matches, local derbies and rivalries, and although the tradition originated at club teams, some national teams also have fans that organise tifos on a regular basis. Tifos are primarily arranged by ultras or a supporter club to show their love to the club, but are sometimes sponsored or arranged by the club itself.

History 
The tifo culture, like the origin of its name, has its roots in Italy and Southern Europe, and has a strong presence in Eastern Europe. It has much in common with the ultras culture and appeared at the same time in the late 1960s and early 1970s.

Tifos, while highly prevalent in Europe, have become more widespread and more common in all parts of the world where association football is played.

Some tifos are political and controversial, as observed in Poland, where a tifo is known as an oprawa or oprawa meczu, and other countries.

See also 
 Card stunt
 Curva
 Football chants
 Football culture
 Ultras

References

Association football culture
Italian words and phrases
Sports fandom